Jozef Horemans (8 September 1910 – 24 October 1977) was a Belgian racing cyclist. He rode in the 1932 Tour de France.

References

1910 births
1977 deaths
Belgian male cyclists
Place of birth missing